The CNID Footballer of the Year (often called the Portuguese Footballer of the Year) was an annual award given to the player who was adjudged to have been the best of the year in Primeira Liga. Between 1970 and 2005, this award was given to a Portuguese footballer playing in a foreign country or any player in Portuguese first League. Since 2006, this award only distinguished the best footballers to play in the Portuguese first League, so was called Primeira Liga Footballer of the Year, and the winner is chosen by a vote amongst the members of the Sports National Press Club (CNID).

The CNID Footballer of the Year award (from 1970 to 2005) has been presented since 1970, when the inaugural winner was Benfica striker Eusébio and the award was conceded by Portuguese newspaper Diário Popular. The last winner of the award was Ricardo Quaresma, in 2005. Seven players won the award on more than one occasion. Figo has won the award on the most occasions, having won six times in a row.

The first CNID Footballer of the Year or Primeira Liga Footballer of the Year award (2006 to present) was won by Quaresma in 2006, and the most recent winner is Benfica midfielder Pizzi. Benfica striker Jonas and former Porto winger Hulk are the only players who have won the award more than once.

CNID Footballer of the Year (1970–2005) 
The "CNID Footballer of the Year" or "Portuguese Footballer of the Year" (from 1970 to 2005) was an annual award given to a Portuguese player in foreign countries or any player in Primeira Liga, who is adjudged to have been the best player of the season. Only one foreign player has been awarded it, with Mário Jardel winning in 2002, although they were frequently nominated in the years previous.) The first award was delivered by the Portuguese newspaper Diário Popular to Benfica forward Eusébio in 1970. Luís Figo has won the trophy on the most occasions with six, all consecutively. The award has been presented on 36 occasions as of 2005 with 23 different winners.

Winners

CNID Best Portuguese Athlete Abroad (2006–) 
The CNID Best Portuguese Athlete Abroad is an annual award given to Portuguese athletes performing outside of Portugal judged by CNID to have been the best. The award is given to footballers as well as to athletes in other fields.

*Only footballers listed

CNID Footballer of the Year (2006–) 

The "CNID Footballer of the Year" or "Primeira Liga Footballer of the Year" award, awarded by the Sports National Press Club (CNID), distinguishes the best footballer playing in the Primeira Liga. In 2006, during the celebration of the CNID's 40th anniversary, the award was officially presented for the first time, to Porto winger Ricardo Quaresma. Since 2011, the SCC and NOS jointly sponsor the CNID awards delivered annually. Under this new sponsorship agreement, all football awards are delivered during the Portuguese League for Professional Football (LPFP) Gala.

See also 
LPFP Awards
Portuguese Golden Ball

Notes

A.  First winner, and the award was delivered by Portuguese newspaper Diário Popular.
B.  First player to win the award twice
C.  First player to win the award three times
D.  First player to win the award in a foreign country
E.  First player to win the award four times
F.  First player to win the award five times
G.  First player to win the award six times (record)

References

External links
Portuguese Footballer of the Year in RSSSF
The official website of CNID

Portuguese football trophies and awards
Awards established in 1970
1970 establishments in Portugal
Annual events in Portugal